Paola e Chiara is an Italian pop music duo consisting of Paola Iezzi and Chiara Iezzi, two sisters who were born in Milan. They are the best selling female Italian group with over 35 million records sold.

Their national career began when the manager of Max Pezzali's pop band 883 saw the sisters playing in Milan and subsequently signed them to the band. The sisters' career as "Paola e Chiara" began in 1997 when they parted from 883.

In 1997, the sisters won the New-Artist category for the song "Amici come prima" at the Sanremo Festival. Soon after, they released their first album.
They have since released five other studio albums, incorporating shifting musical influences (such as Spanish Pop and Celtic elements) and performing in several different languages, achieving international success in 2000.

In July 2013, the duo released the album Giungla, which also features rappers Razza Krasta and Moreno. Shortly after the release of the album, they announced their separation.

Background

Chiara Iezzi was born on 27 February 1973, and Paola Iezzi was born on 30 March 1974.

The sisters formed their first music group called Elefunky, which specialized in funky music. They played in various clubs in Milan and were discovered by manager Claudio Cecchetto, who was looking for a group that would help artist Max Pezzali.

The sisters left the club scene and joined up with Max Pezzali to play at many festivals in Italy. They became part of Pezzali's band 883, playing the guitar and the trombone. The group released in 1995 the album La donna, il sogno e il grande incubo. After a big tour to promote the album, the sisters decided to become solo artists.

The sisters visited Scotland after seeing the movie Braveheart, to visit the locations where the movie was shot. The trip was an inspiration to both and gave them a feeling of real freedom. The sisters returned to Scotland again and were inspired to write many songs.

They decided to participate in the Sanremo Festival new-talent search in 1996. The song "In viaggio" ("In Transit") led the sisters to win the contest, gaining fans and admiration.

On 4 December 2022, it was officially announced that Paola e Chiara would participate in the Sanremo Music Festival 2023. "Furore" was later announced as their entry for the Sanremo Music Festival 2023.

Music career

Ci chiamano bambine (1997)
Released: 2 February 1997
Chart peak: #33 (ITA)

In 1997, after the victory in the New-Artist section of the Sanremo Festival, they released their first album, Ci chiamano bambine ("They Call Us Children"). The album contained a mixture of rock and pop music. They went on to release other three singles from the album: "Ci chiamano bambine", "Bella" and "Ti vada o no" (included in the Italian original soundtrack of the Walt Disney animated film Hercules). With "Per Te", they took part in the 1998 Sanremo Festival, releasing a new edition of the debut album. Ci chiamano bambine went platinum, selling more than 150,000 copies.

Giornata storica (1998)
Released: 29 October 1998
Chart peak: –

After a successful tour of Italy, they released the second album titled Giornata storica ("Historical Day") in November 1998. The album had an Irish flavour and a more rock sound. Despite this, most of the Italian public didn't seem to connect with the album and sales were disappointing.

Three singles were released from the album, "Non puoi dire di no", "Nina" and "Colpo di fulmine", the first gaining heavy rotation on television.

Television (2000)
Released: 19 June 2001
Chart peak: #23; (ITA) No. 32 (SWI)

After a long break, the huge summer hit song "Vamos a bailar" (Spanish for "Let's Dance", in a Latin pop style and featuring Spanish lyrics) was released in April 2000. The song remained on top of the Italian charts for many weeks. The track was included in the lucky dance-pop album Television. It was seen as a change in style, being a mixture of Spanish Pop tunes and dance beats.

Four singles were released from the album:
 "Vamos a bailar"
 "Amoremidai"
 "Viva el amor! (Rapino Brothers Remix)"
 "Fino alla fine (2001 Vision)"

In the summer of 2000 Paola a Chiara won the Festivalbar Best Song Award with "Vamos a bailar"  achieving success all over Europe, Japan and Latin America.
The album is also available in English and Spanish, and went on selling about 800,000 copies around the world. In June 2001  Television got a face-lift and was re-released with remixed tracks and multimedia content.

Festival (2002)
Released: 24 June 2002
Chart peak: #13; (ITA)

May 2002 saw the release of the fourth album Festival and its first single, also called "Festival". The song reached number six in the Italian single chart. The album showed a slight change in direction, being more melodic and vocally more elaborate and textured even if again based on dance music.

Three singles were released from Festival
"Festival"
"Hey!"
"Kamasutra (Dance Rebel Mix)"

Blu (2004)
Released: 10 May 2004
Chart peak: #27; (ITA)

In 2004 the album Blu followed the same direction as the previous two albums, but with a slight change of style towards the 1980s electropop. Despite high expectations, the single "Blu" did not make it as a big summer hit of 2004 and further singles were stalled.

Two singles were released from "Blu":
"Blu"
"Mare di più" (Radio only)

Greatest Hits (2005)

Released: 24 February 2005
Chart peak: #25; (ITA)

2005 saw the end of the first chapter in the sisters' career with the release of Greatest Hits. This collection featured two new songs that were released as singles in the same year and a DVD (also available separately) that contains all their promo videos and some "making of" of the aforementioned clips. An appetizer from the collection was the Sanremo Festival tune "A modo mio". Later in the summer of 2005 the second new track from the collection, "Fatalità", was released and followed by a tour that ended in September.

Nothing at All (2007)
Released: 26 January 2007
Chart peak: #2 (ITA)

Chiara released a solo single CD in January 2007 called "Nothing at All" for Raising Malawi, based on a song by Madonna, "You Thrill Me/Erotica". The song peaked at number 2 in Italy.

Win The Game (2007)
Released: 16 November 2007
Chart peak: #40; (ITA)

In June 2007 Paola e Chiara released the first single off their sixth studio album, Win the Game.  It was released prior to the album's debut.  The single "Second Life" peaked in the Italian chart at No. 4.

The success of Win The Game on the Italian markets was relatively poor. The album entered the Italian album chart at No. 40 and disappeared from the chart the following week.

The second single, released in October 2007, was the song "Cambiare pagina". The third single, "Vanity & Pride", saw a limited release in May 2008. All singles from Win the Game were released in two formats, CD single and vinyl.

Alone (2009)
In January 2009 Paola published a solo single, an English-language tune called "Alone", which peaked at number 36 in Italy. The song differs a lot from the previous work of the sisters, with a strong soul and R&B flavour.
Only available digitally, in February 2009 an EP of remixes of "Alone" was published, called "Dancing Alone".

Other selected singles

DVDs

Discography

Studio albums
1997: Ci Chiamano Bambine
1998: Giornata Storica
2000: Television
2002: Festival
2004: Blu
2007: Win the Game
2010: Milleluci
2013: Giungla

DVDs
2005: Paola e Chiara The Video Collection: 1997–2005

Top ten singles

References

External links
Official website
Official website for Chiara
SonyBMG site
 Official Italian Charts

 

Musical groups established in 1997
Italian pop music groups
Italian girl groups
Italian dance music groups
Sibling musical duos
Sanremo Music Festival winners of the newcomers section
Musical groups from Milan
Italian musical duos
Female musical duos
Sister duos